Dryanovo Heights (Dryanovski Vazvisheniya \'drya-nov-ski v&-zvi-'she-ni-ya\)
The ice-covered heights rising to 520 m in the northwest part of Greenwich Island. Extending 13 km in northwest-southeast direction, and 7 km in northeast-southwest direction. Featuring Mount Plymouth in the east, Crutch Peaks in the northwest, Lloyd Hill in the southwest, and Malamir Knoll in the southeast.

Named after the Bulgarian town of Dryanovo.

Registered in the SCAR Composite Antarctic Gazetteer.

Location

Maps
 L.L. Ivanov et al. Antarctica: Livingston Island and Greenwich Island, South Shetland Islands. Scale 1:100000 topographic map. Sofia: Antarctic Place-names Commission of Bulgaria, 2005.
 L.L. Ivanov. Antarctica: Livingston Island and Greenwich, Robert, Snow and Smith Islands. Scale 1:120000 topographic map.  Troyan: Manfred Wörner Foundation, 2009.

References
 Dryanovo Heights. SCAR Composite Gazetteer of Antarctica.
 Bulgarian Antarctic Gazetteer. Antarctic Place-names Commission. (details in Bulgarian, basic data in English)

External links
Dryanovo Heights. Copernix satellite image

Mountains of the South Shetland Islands
Bulgaria and the Antarctic